Arbatan is a village and the most populous municipality, except for the capital Salyan, in the Salyan Rayon of Azerbaijan.  It has a population of 5,463.

References 

Populated places in Salyan District (Azerbaijan)